Centrinopus is a genus of flower weevils in the beetle family Curculionidae. There are about 19 described species in Centrinopus.

Species
These 19 species belong to the genus Centrinopus:

 Centrinopus alternatus Casey, 1892
 Centrinopus angusticollis Casey, 1920
 Centrinopus astutus Kuschel, 1983
 Centrinopus brevior Casey, 1920
 Centrinopus curtulatus Casey, 1920
 Centrinopus delicatulus Hustache, 1950
 Centrinopus elegantulus Hustache, 1950
 Centrinopus erythropus Champion & G.C., 1908
 Centrinopus furfurosus Champion & G.C., 1908
 Centrinopus helvinus Casey, 1892
 Centrinopus longulus Casey, 1922
 Centrinopus lucifer Casey, 1920
 Centrinopus mendax Casey & T.L., 1920
 Centrinopus mixtus Champion & G.C., 1909
 Centrinopus rugicollis Casey, 1920
 Centrinopus scutellinus Casey, 1920
 Centrinopus tabascanus Casey, 1920
 Centrinopus tectus Casey, 1922
 Centrinopus uniseriatus Casey, 1920

References

Further reading

 
 
 

Baridinae
Articles created by Qbugbot